Phydanis is a genus of flea beetles in the family Chrysomelidae. There are 2 described species, found in North America and Mexico.

Species
 Phydanis bicolor Horn, 1889
 Phydanis nigriventris Jacoby

References

Alticini
Chrysomelidae genera
Articles created by Qbugbot
Taxa named by George Henry Horn